Rafael Ramos Jiménez (born 16 July 1997), commonly known as Pipo, is a Spanish footballer who plays as a winger for UE Cornellà, on loan from AD Alcorcón.

Club career
Born in La Alberca, Salamanca, Castille and León, Pipo joined UCAM Murcia CF's youth setup in 2013, from AD Guadalupe. He made his senior debut with the reserves on 6 September 2015, starting in a 2–0 away win against Mazarrón FC, and scored his first senior goal seven days later in a 6–0 home routing of AD Alquerías.

After scoring eleven goals during the campaign and helping his side achieve promotion to the Tercera División, Pipo signed a one-year extension to his contract on 22 June 2016. He made his first-team debut on 6 May of the following year, coming on as a late substitute for Iban Salvador in a 0–1 away loss against CD Numancia in the Segunda División.

On 10 August 2018, Pipo left UCAM for SCR Peña Deportiva, winning the Balearic Islands group of the Tercera División and achieving promotion in his first season. He then signed for UD Las Palmas Atlético on 20 June 2019, but terminated his contract within three days, and went back to his former team in the Segunda División B.

On 17 September 2020, Pipo agreed to a three-year contract with AD Alcorcón, being immediately loaned to third division side Cultural y Deportiva Leonesa for the 2020–21 season. On 3 August of the following year, he moved to  Primera División RFEF club UE Cornellà also in a temporary deal.

References

External links

1997 births
Living people
Sportspeople from the Province of Salamanca
Spanish footballers
Footballers from Castile and León
Association football wingers
Segunda División players
Segunda División B players
Tercera División players
UCAM Murcia CF B players
UCAM Murcia CF players
SCR Peña Deportiva players
UD Las Palmas Atlético players
AD Alcorcón footballers
Cultural Leonesa footballers
UE Cornellà players